Lonnie Duane Kruger (born August 19, 1952) is a retired American college and professional basketball coach who was most recently the men's basketball head coach of the University of Oklahoma. Kruger played college basketball for Kansas State University.  He has served as the head coach of the University of Texas–Pan American, Kansas State, the University of Florida, the University of Illinois, and the University of Nevada, Las Vegas, as well as the Atlanta Hawks of the National Basketball Association (NBA).

Kruger was the first coach to lead five programs to the NCAA tournament (he has since been joined by Tubby Smith and Rick Pitino). His teams have participated in 17 NCAA Tournaments, including two Final Fours (1994 with Florida; 2016 with Oklahoma).

Early life

Kruger was born and raised in Silver Lake, Kansas. As a point guard, Kruger led the Kansas State Wildcats to back-to-back Big Eight championships in 1972 and 1973 under coach Jack Hartman.  Kruger was named the Big Eight Player of the Year in 1973 and 1974, after being named the Big Eight Sophomore of the Year in 1972.  He was also a shortstop on the Kansas State baseball team.

He was a ninth-round pick of the Atlanta Hawks in the 1974 NBA draft. Kruger also tried out with the Detroit Pistons, and played professionally in Israel. He also played a season of minor league baseball in the St. Louis Cardinals organization and was invited to training camp with the Dallas Cowboys as a quarterback.

Head coaching career

Kansas State
As basketball coach of the Wildcats, Kruger led K-State to the NCAA tournament in each of his four seasons as head coach and the Elite Eight in 1988 — a team featuring future NBA players Mitch Richmond and Steve Henson — before losing to archrival Kansas Jayhawks, the eventual national champion.

From Kansas State, Kruger moved south to the University of Florida, taking over a program that had limited success not only nationally, but in the Southeastern Conference.

Florida
In his six seasons with Florida, Kruger compiled a 104–80 mark. In the process, he led the University of Florida to its first Final Four appearance in 1994.

He was named SEC coach of the year in 1992 and 1994.

Illinois
Kruger accepted the vacant position at Illinois. While there, he became the only Big Ten coach to successfully sign three consecutive Illinois Mr. Basketball winners, after inking Sergio McClain, Frank Williams, and Brian Cook between 1997 and 1999.

UNLV
Kruger accepted the job at UNLV in 2004. His son, Kevin, took advantage of a new NCAA rule, called Proposal 2005–54, before the 2006–2007 season to transfer from Arizona State and immediately play for his father at UNLV without sitting out one year.  The controversial rule was repealed for the following season due to what some claimed were the unintended consequence of allowing players with undergraduate diplomas to immediately begin playing for another school without sitting out for any time.

In 2007, Kruger led the Runnin' Rebels to the Sweet Sixteen of the NCAA Tournament, which was the team's first trip there since Jerry Tarkanian led it in 1991.

On February 9, 2008, the UNLV Runnin' Rebels beat Colorado State 68–51 at home for Kruger's 400th career win.

Oklahoma
On April 1, 2011, Kruger accepted the head coaching position with the Oklahoma Sooners, replacing the fired Jeff Capel.  Kruger's new compensation package reportedly exceed $2.2 million annually. Despite his success, he was not immune to criticism, having won just one regular season conference championship in his lengthy college coaching career (Illinois tied for the Big Ten title in 1997–98).  However, Kruger has generally enjoyed a positive reputation.

On November 30, 2012, Kruger earned his 500th career head coaching victory as the Sooners beat Northwestern State 69–65 in Norman.

On March 17, 2013, Kruger became the only head coach in Division I history to lead five programs to the NCAA tournament when the Sooners were named a No. 10 seed in the South region. The feat was later matched by Tubby Smith in 2016 when he took Texas Tech to the tournament.

On March 20, 2015, Kruger became the only head coach in Division I history to win an NCAA tournament game with five programs. He is one of four active coaches who have had three teams in the Elite Eight.

Kruger reached his second career Final Four, this time with Oklahoma, in 2016.

On February 25, 2017, Kruger earned his 600th career head coaching victory as the Sooners beat Kansas State 81–51 in Norman.

After 10 seasons at OU, it was announced on March 25, 2021 that he planned to retire.

Professional coaching
Prior to accepting the head coaching position at UNLV in 2004, Kruger was the head coach of the Atlanta Hawks of the NBA.  It was as head coach of the Hawks that Kruger guaranteed season-ticket holders in 2003 that the Hawks would make the playoffs or get a $125 refund.  The Hawks failed to make the playoffs and Kruger was fired midway through the 2002–2003 season.

Kruger was an assistant coach under Rudy Tomjanovich for the US national team in the 1998 FIBA World Championship, winning the bronze medal.

Head coaching record

College

NBA

|-
| align="left" |Atlanta
| align="left" |
| 82||25||57||.305|| align="center" |7th in Central||—||—||—||—
| align="center" |Missed Playoffs
|-
| align="left" |Atlanta
| align="left" |
| 82||33||49||.402|| align="center" |6th in Central||—||—||—||—
| align="center" |Missed Playoffs
|-
| align="left" |Atlanta
| align="left" |
| 27||11||16||.407|| align="center" |(fired)||—||—||—||—
| align="center" |—
|-
|-class="sortbottom"
| style="text-align:left;"|Career
| ||191||69||122||.361||align="center" |–||—||—||—||—

See also
 List of college men's basketball coaches with 600 wins
 List of NCAA Division I Men's Final Four appearances by coach

References

Bibliography 
 Dortch, Chris, String Music: Inside the Rise of SEC Basketball, Brassey's, Inc., Dulles, Virginia (2002).  .
 Koss, Bill, Pond Birds: Gator Basketball, The Whole Story From The Inside, Fast Break Press, Gainesville, Florida (1996).  .

External links
 Oklahoma profile
 UNLV profile
 Illinois profile
 NBA coaching record

1952 births
Living people
American men's basketball coaches
American men's basketball players
Atlanta Hawks draft picks
Atlanta Hawks head coaches
Basketball coaches from Kansas
Basketball players from Kansas
College men's basketball head coaches in the United States
Florida Gators men's basketball coaches
Illinois Fighting Illini men's basketball coaches
Kansas State Wildcats baseball players
Kansas State Wildcats men's basketball coaches
Kansas State Wildcats men's basketball players
New York Knicks assistant coaches
Oklahoma Sooners men's basketball coaches
People from Shawnee County, Kansas
Pittsburg State Gorillas men's basketball coaches
Sportspeople from Manhattan, Kansas
St. Petersburg Cardinals players
UT Rio Grande Valley Vaqueros men's basketball coaches
UNLV Runnin' Rebels basketball coaches
Point guards